"Give Me All Your Love" is a song by the English rock band Whitesnake. The song is taken from the group's 1987 multi-platinum self-titled album. Being the fourth single released from the album, the track reached number 48 on the US Top 100 charts, number 22 on the Mainstream Rock Charts, number 18 in the UK charts, and 49 in New Zealand.

Details
The single was originally written by singer David Coverdale and guitarist John Sykes, and has been a mainstay in Whitesnake's set-list even to this day, long after Sykes' departure from the band.

A music video was also made for the song, and it had the lowest budget out of all the music videos for 1987's Whitesnake. The music video starts with the band flying to the venue and arriving backstage. The rest of the video features the band performing the song on a concert stage at Meadowlands Arena in East Rutherford, New Jersey during their 1987 US tour. The music video differs greatly from the others for Whitesnake, as it doesn't feature David Coverdale's then-girlfriend Tawny Kitaen.

The song's 1988 single release featured a new guitar solo which had been recorded by the band's newest member, Vivian Campbell, known as "Give Me All Your Love ('88 Mix)" (this is the version that is heard in the music video). Campbell later said, "That’s the only thing I recorded with Whitesnake. We went in and mixed that track. I did a guitar solo on it."

Reception
Critic Gavin Edwards said, "the music starts, and I wish it hadn’t. "Give Me All Your Love" is a big slice of generic uptempo rock pomp. For too many reasons to detail, I'd rather be writing about the chart-topping "Here I Go Again"."

Cash Box called it "a curt, metallic, rave-out that shows what this band is really about."

Remixed for 2021's The Blues Album, it was said it had, "a refreshing tweak which pulls John Sykes guitar riffery to the fore with wonderful clarity."

Track list
"Give Me All Your Love" - 3:30
"Fool for Your Loving" - 4:14 (Vinyl LP/CD)
"Don't Break My Heart Again" - 3:46 (CD)
"Here I Go Again (USA Single Remix)" - 3:53 (CD)

Personnel
 David Coverdale – lead vocals
 John Sykes – guitars, backing vocals
 Neil Murray – bass
 Aynsley Dunbar – drums, percussion

Special guests
 Don Airey – keyboards
 Bill Cuomo – keyboards
 Vivian Campbell - guitar solo on '88 Mix

Charts

References

1988 singles
Whitesnake songs
Songs written by David Coverdale
Song recordings produced by Keith Olsen
Songs written by John Sykes
Song recordings produced by Mike Stone (record producer)
1987 songs
Geffen Records singles
EMI Records singles